Alessandro Conticchio (born 19 January 1974) is an Italian association football and former manager of  Viterbese and former player, currently in charge as Cristiano Lucarelli's technical collaborator at Catania.

Career

Player
Born in Celleno, Lazio region, Conticchio started his professional career at Gualdo of Umbria region, Lecce, Torino, Cagliari and Avellino.

Coach
In the season 2011–12 he has become, until the end of the season, the coach of Viterbese in Serie D, in place of the resigned Raffaele Sergio.

He then joined forces with former teammate Cristiano Lucarelli, serving at his assistant at Viareggio and Pistoiese, and as a technical collaborator at 
Tuttocuoio, Messina and most recently Catania.

References

External links
Gazzetta dello Sport player profile 

Italian footballers
A.S. Gualdo Casacastalda players
U.S. Lecce players
Torino F.C. players
Cagliari Calcio players
U.S. Avellino 1912 players
Serie A players
Serie B players
Serie C players
Association football midfielders
Sportspeople from the Province of Viterbo
1974 births
Living people
Footballers from Lazio